The 1948 Buffalo Bulls football team was an American football team that represented the University of Buffalo as an independent during the 1948 college football season. In its first season under head coach Frank Clair, the team compiled a 6–1–1 record. The team played its home games at Civic Stadium in Buffalo, New York.

Schedule

References

Bufflao Bulls
Buffalo Bulls football seasons
Buffalo Bulls football